Zalf–Euromobil–Fior is an Italian cycling team founded in 1982, that focuses on developing under-23 riders. Many famous riders have ridden for the team, including Sacha Modolo, Enrico Battaglin, Ivan Basso and Oscar Gatto. In 2021, the team moved up to UCI Continental level for the first time.

Team roster

Major results

2005
 Giro del Canavese, Oscar Gatto
2006
 GP Capodarco, Marco Bandiera
 Giro del Casentino, Sacha Modolo
 Coppa Città di Asti, Oscar Gatto
 Giro del Belvedere, Fabrizio Galeazzi
 Circuito del Porto, Manolo Zanella
2007
 Giro delle Valli Aretine, Davide Malacarne
 Gran Premio della Liberazione, Manuele Boaro
 Trofeo Franco Balestra, Simone Ponzi
 Trofeo Zsšdi, Simone Ponzi
2008
 Gran Premio Palio del Recioto, Gianluca Brambilla
 Trofeo Zsšdi, Manuele Boaro
2009
 Overall Giro del Friuli-Venezia Giulia, Gianluca Brambilla
 Memorial Davide Fardelli, Manuele Boaro
 Trofeo Città di San Vendemiano, Alessandro Mazzi
 Giro delle Valli Aretine, Enrico Battaglin
 Gran Premio della Liberazione, Sacha Modolo
 Giro del Belvedere, Sacha Modolo
2010
 Trofeo Alcide Degasperi, Sonny Colbrelli
 GP Capodarco, Enrico Battaglin
 Trofeo Piva, Andrea Pasqualon
 Giro del Casentino, Andrea Pasqualon
 Gran Premio San Giuseppe, Enrico Battaglin
 Trofeo Città di San Vendemiano, Stefano Agostini
2011
 Overall Giro del Friuli-Venezia Giulia, Matteo Busato
 Gran Premio San Giuseppe, Enrico Battaglin
 Trofeo Zsšdi, Enrico Battaglin
 Giro del Belvedere, Nicola Boem
2012
 Circuito del Porto, Paolo Simion
2013
 Ruota d'Oro, Andrea Toniatti
 Trofeo Edil C, Andrea Zordan
 Gran Premio di Poggiana, Andrea Zordan
 Circuito del Porto, Paolo Simion
2014
 Trofeo Città di San Vendemiano, Giacomo Berlato
 Ruota d'Oro, Giacomo Berlato
 Giro del Belvedere, Simone Andreetta
 Stage 4 Giro del Friuli-Venezia Giulia, Simone Andreetta
 Piccolo Giro di Lombardia, Gianni Moscon
2015
 Coppa della Pace, Simone Velasco
 Ruota d'Oro, Simone Velasco
 Trofeo Città di San Vendemiano, Gianni Moscon
 Giro del Belvedere, Andrea Vendrame
2016
 Circuito del Porto, Marco Maronese
2017
 La Popolarissima, Filippo Calderaro
 Gran Premio di Poggiana, Nicola Conci
 Trofeo Città di San Vendemiano, Nicola Conci
2018
 La Popolarissima, Giovanni Lonardi
 Circuito del Porto, Giovanni Lonardi
 Trofeo Città di San Vendemiano, Alberto Dainese
 Gran Premio Industrie del Marmo, Gregorio Ferri
2020
 Giro Ciclistico d'Italia
1st  Points classification, Luca Colnaghi
1st  Young rider classification, Edoardo Zambanini
1st Stages 2 & 3, Luca Colnaghi
2022
 Trofeo Città di San Vendemiano, Federico Guzzo

National Championships
2013
  Romania road race, Andrei Nechita
  Italy Under-23 road race, Andrea Zordan
2015
  Italy Under-23 road race, Gianni Moscon

References

External links
  

Cycling teams established in 1982
Cycling teams based in Italy
UCI Continental Teams (Europe)